Weston-super-Mare railway station serves the seaside town of Weston-super-Mare in North Somerset, England.  It is situated on a loop off the main Bristol to Taunton Line,  from the zero point at  via Box.

The station is operated by Great Western Railway. It consists of two platforms linked by a covered footbridge which is also used as a public footpath between roads on either side of the station.  Trains may use either platform in either direction, and many services are booked to pass each other at the station.

History

1841 station 

The Bristol and Exeter Railway arrived in Weston-super-Mare on 14 June 1841. This was not the route that serves today's station, but rather a single-track branch line from Weston Junction railway station, midway between the present-day Worle and Uphill junctions, which terminated at a small station in Regent Street close to the High Street.

The trains on this first branch line were made up of two or three small carriages which were hauled by a team of three horses. It was reported that, when a strong wind was blowing towards the train, passengers sometimes got out and walked as it could be quicker! By 1850 a limited number of trains were being worked by steam locomotives, but horses continued to be used on certain trains until 31 March 1851.

The station had a train shed that covered two tracks, although only one passenger platform was provided.  Between this and the High Street was the Railway Hotel; in the other direction a level crossing was provided to carry the line across Locking Road, the eastwards continuation of Regent Street. A small engine shed was eventually provided here to house the steam locomotive.

After closure, the land was eventually gifted to the town and planted with trees, giving rise to its unofficial name of "The Plantation". A floral clock was built on the site of the station building. Although the mechanism has not worked for many years, the raised flower bed is still planted each year to commemorate a local or national event. Next to this is a scale replica of North Star, the first locomotive to run on the Great Western Railway. It was erected in 2006 to commemorate to 200th anniversary of the birth of Isambard Kingdom Brunel, the engineer who designed this first station. The Railway Hotel is currently known as Tavern Inn the Town.

1866 station 

New goods facilities were opened on the junction side of Locking Road in 1862; the first goods dispatched were three truck loads of flower pots from the nearby Royal Pottery. On 20 July 1866, a large passenger station was opened adjacent to this, which allowed the closure of Brunel's 1841 terminus and the elimination of the Locking Road level crossing, although a second one across Devonshire Road remained. The branch was given a second track at the same time.

The new station again featured a train shed which covered the platforms. This was designed by the railway's engineer, Francis Fox, and was similar to the one built by him at about the same time at Exeter. The two platforms were supplemented by an excursion platform next to the goods depot. A new Bristol and Exeter Hotel was opened to serve the new station; it was later renamed The Town Crier. A signal box was provided and is now the earliest part of the station to survive. Although disused, it is believed to be the oldest signal box in Britain. It shows signs of a later extension to allow extra signal levers needed when the station was enlarged.

Until now the branch had been part of Brunel's  broad gauge network, but on 1 July 1875 a third rail was added to each line which allowed  gauge trains to also reach the town. From 1879 no broad gauge trains were timetabled along the branch, although they continued to operate on the main line until 20 May 1892. In the meantime, the Bristol and Exeter Railway had been amalgamated into the Great Western Railway on 1 January 1876.

1884 station 

The Bristol and Exeter Railway had obtained an Act of Parliament in 1875 to construct a new loop line through the town, which would allow trains to serve the town and then continue along the main line. No action was taken on this for many years which led to a planning blight along the proposed route.  An 1880 court case forced the Great Western Railway to pay 5% interest to the affected property owners, which prompted the railway company into action.

The new line and station were opened on 1 March 1884. This was not the end of the old branch line as for several years a trolley was taken along the old tracks to collect mail from a postal train at the old Junction station each night. There was also a need to serve the town's gas works until 1972, and this was done along a short section of the old branch including the level crossing over Devonshire Road which had a roundabout built on it after the remainder of the branch became Winterstoke Road.

The new station consisted of three platforms – two through platforms and an east-facing terminal bay – and was given hipped glass and iron canopies to keep the weather off passengers. A carriage siding was provided between the two main platforms and some more were built on land to the south of the station. Yet more sidings and an engine shed were on the north side of the line near the 1866 station which quickly found itself being reopened for goods traffic until final closure on 30 June 1966.

A new terminal station was opened in 1914 to deal with excursion traffic, being known as Locking Road station, while the main station was known as Weston-super-Mare General. In the 1950s as many as 30,000 excursionists could arrive at the station on a sunny bank holiday. Most came on trains from the Bristol area but some would travel further. The platforms at Locking Road closed on 6 September 1964. The area once used by the 1866 and Locking Road stations, along with the sidings, has now been replaced by a Tesco store and a large car and coach park.

The loop line was singled on 31 January 1972. Most of the sidings were removed at this time and the bay platform (Platform 3) was reduced to the status of a siding. Two signal boxes – one at each end of the station – were closed and new colour light signals provided. These are controlled from a panel signal box at Bristol Temple Meads, but an emergency panel was provided in the station supervisor's office (which has since been removed) that can be used to control the line from Puxton Signal Box to Uphill Junction along both the loop line and avoiding line when there are problems with the normal signalling system.

The station itself was refurbished in 1986 with a new booking office. A few years later the canopy was renewed. This saw the removal of a few bays of the canopy at the east end of the station, and the replacement of the hipped canopy by a simpler modern design, although the original cast iron columns support this. Some hipped bays remain on the road side of the station entrance as a reminder of how it all once looked.

The 1866-built signal box was listed at Grade II by Historic England on 17 August 1987. The main station buildings were given the same status on 20 November 2017.

Services 

Additional services superimposed on these local trains include through services to London Paddington.

Buses operate from the railway station to Axbridge, Cheddar, Wells, Burnham-on-Sea, and Bristol Airport, as well as most parts of the town.

See also 

 Other railway stations in Weston-super-Mare
Weston Milton railway station
Worle railway station
Disused railway stations (Bristol to Exeter Line)
Puxton and Worle railway station
Weston Junction railway station
Bleadon and Uphill railway station
Weston, Clevedon and Portishead Railway

References 

Railway stations in Weston-super-Mare
Former Great Western Railway stations
Railway stations in Great Britain opened in 1841
Railway stations in Great Britain closed in 1884
Railway stations in Great Britain opened in 1884
Railway stations served by Great Western Railway
Grade II listed buildings in North Somerset
Grade II listed railway stations
DfT Category C2 stations